Fuji Satisfaction: Soundclash In Lagos is a studio album by BANTU. The album features vocal contributions by Nigerian Fuji musician Adewale Ayuba. It was recorded between April and December 2004 at various studios in Cologne, Berlin and Lagos, Nigeria. The album was released in June 2005 by Piranha Music. Producer Herb V produced the album by combining programmed beats and samples with Yoruba percussion instruments like the Sakara, Apala, Omele, Bata and Iya Ilu drums, Additional production and instrumentation was provided by the Berlin-based Afrobeat Academy Band. The Subject matter on Fuji Satisfaction deals with Pan Africanism, homophobia and Yoruba identity.
The album marked a turning point for BANTU as it took them closer to their Yoruba roots. It also stretched conventional perception of Fuji music by fusing it with Hiphop, Dancehall, Afrobeat and Afrofunk elements. The album debuted at number 2 on the European World Music Charts. BANTU was awarded the Kora Awards (the Pan African equivalent of the Grammies) in the categories "Best Group West Africa" and "Best Group Africa" for Fuji Satisfaction

Recording and production 
BANTU and Adewale Ayuba first met in Cologne, Germany while Ayuba was touring Europe citing a mutual admiration for each other's music they decided to record a two track demo with Herb V. The songs "Fuji Satisfaction" and "Mama" where shopped around and the band eventually landed a recording deal with Berlin-based independent label Piranha Records. Further recording was then arranged to be done in the summer of 2004 in Lagos. Armed with sound sketches and programmed beats Herb V and Ade Bantu rented Sonny Okosun's Studios in Ogba, Lagos and proceeded to record members of Ayuba's percussion ensemble and Adewale Ayuba. On their return to Germany Ade Bantu engaged the services of Afrobeat Academy band and Oghene Kologbo of Fela Kuti's Africa 70 band to produce the songs "Follow Your Road Go", "How Real (can a real, real be?)", "Rise Up To The Occasion" and "Listen Attentively". Asides from Adewale Ayuba, lead vocal contributions was also provided by Blain Pawlos and Mirta Junco Wambrug. Eight of the 11 songs on the album where mixed by GB Dewa at Gompa Studios, Berlin. The song °Fuji Satisfaction° was mixed by Ricki Ojijo while "Mama" was mixed by Neil Perch of Zion Train.

Track listing
 Intro" 0:35  	   	
 Fuji Satisfaction  3:11 		
 Oya - 6:15  	
 Follow Your Road Go" 4:21 	
 Mt. Fuji 4:35 
 Where di water, where di lighter? 3:16 		
 Mama 4:56	
 How Real (can a real, real be?) 6:14 	 	
 Many lessons 3:51 		
 Rise Up To The Occasion 4:47 	
 Listen Attentively 7:54

Musicians
Ade Bantu – Lead vocals, backing vocals
Adewale Ayuba – Lead vocals, backing vocals 
Blain Pawlos – Lead vocals, backing vocals
Don Abi aka Abiodun – Lead vocals, backing vocals
Mirta Junco Wambrug – Lead vocals, backing vocals
Akeem Egunjobi – Backing vocals
Mukaila Afolabi – Backing vocals 
Oladapo Adebayo – Backing vocals
Teniade Olafisoye – Backing vocals
Ben Abarbanel-Wolff – Saxophones, wood flute
Daniel Allen – Trumpet
Frank Schellenberger – Rhodes, Hammond
Mandjao Fati – Bass, guitar
Matt Hutchinson – Rhodes 
Oghene Kologbo – Guitar, drums, bass, backing vocals
Reiner Witzel – Saxophones, flute
Azeez Allabi – Sakara drum
Basiru Olayori – Apala drum
Ganiyu Olusola – Omele Apala drum
Jelili Ayanrinde – Iya Ilu drum
Mudasiru Ayansina – Bata drum
Taiwo Boaji – Omele Apala

References

2005 albums
Yoruba
Bantu (band) albums